Aaptos rosacea is a species of sea sponge belonging to the family Suberitidae. The species was described in 1994.

References

External links
Aaptos rosacea: occurrence data from GBIF

Aaptos
Animals described in 1994
Taxa named by Patricia Bergquist
Taxa named by Michelle Kelly (marine scientist)